The second cabinet of Gheorghe Tătărăscu was the government of Romania from 2 October 1934 to 28 August 1936.

Ministers
The ministers of the cabinet were as follows:

President of the Council of Ministers:
Gheorghe Tătărăscu (2 October 1934 - 28 August 1936)
Minister of the Interior:
Ion Inculeț (2 October 1934 - 28 August 1936)
Minister of Foreign Affairs: 
(interim) Gheorghe Tătărăscu (2 - 10 October 1934)
Nicolae Titulescu (10 October 1934 - 28 August 1936)
Minister of Finance:
Victor Slăvescu (2 October 1934 - 1 February 1935)
Victor Antonescu (1 February 1935 - 28 August 1936)
Minister of Justice:
Victor Antonescu (2 October 1934 - 1 February 1935)
Valeriu Pop (1 February 1935 - 28 August 1936)
Minister of National Defence:
Gen. Paul Angelescu (2 October 1934 - 28 August 1936)
Minister of Armaments:
Gheorghe Tătărăscu (2 October 1934 - 28 August 1936)
Minister of Agriculture and Property
Vasile P. Sassu (2 October 1934 - 28 August 1936)
Minister of Industry and Commerce:
(interim) Victor Slăvescu (2 - 5 October 1934)
Ion Manolescu-Strunga (5 October 1934 - 1 August 1935)
(interim) Ion Costinescu (1 August - 23 September 1935)
 Ion Costinescu (23 September 1935 - 28 August 1936)
Minister of Public Works and Communications:
Richard Franasovici (2 October 1934 - 28 August 1936)
Minister of Public Instruction:
Constantin Angelescu (2 October 1934 - 28 August 1936)
Minister of Religious Affairs and the Arts:
Alexandru Lapedatu (2 October 1934 - 28 August 1936)
Minister of Labour:
Ion Nistor (2 October 1934 - 23 September 1935)
Minister of Health and Social Security:
Ion Costinescu (2 October 1934 - 23 September 1935)
Minister of Labour, Health and Social Security:
Ion Nistor (23 September 1935 - 28 August 1936)

Minister Secretaries of State:
Valeriu Pop (2 October 1934 - 1 February 1935)
Victor Iamandi (2 October 1934 - 28 August 1936)

References

Cabinets of Romania
Cabinets established in 1934
Cabinets disestablished in 1936
1934 establishments in Romania
1936 disestablishments in Romania